Lyophyllum decastes, commonly known as the fried chicken mushroom, or chicken of the gravel, is an edible (when cooked) species of fungus in the family Lyophyllaceae that grows in clusters on disturbed ground, often near man-made roads in gravel, with a faintly radish-like taste.

Description
The spores are white.

Gills are white but may yellow slightly with age. The firm flesh remains white on exposure.

Ecology
Growing in dense, even huge clusters on the ground, L. decastes is usually found where the ground has been disturbed such as roadbeds, gravel, paths, landscaping areas, and sometimes in woods.

Range
Prolific in summer and fall until spring on the U.S. West Coast, it is widely distributed in North America and Europe.

Edibility
This species is considered edible and good, but should be tried with caution due to some reports of gastric upset, as well as the possibility of confusing it with poisonous Entoloma species or Clitocybe dilatata.  The similar species Lyophyllum loricatum is also edible.

Similar species
Lyophyllum decastes is similar in appearance to the toxic species Leucocybe connata, Clitocybe dilatata, and those of the Entoloma genus. Lyophyllum semitale and Pluteus petasatus are also similar in appearance.

L. fumosum is also similar; it and L. loricatum are sometimes grouped with L. decastes owing to a lack of distinct features.

References

Further reading
Breitenbach, J. & Kränzlin, F. (1991). Fungi of Switzerland. Volume 3: Boletes and Agarics (1st Part). Strobilomycetaceae, Boletaceae, Paxillaceae, Gomphidiaceae, Hygrophoraceae, Tricholomataceae, Polyporaceae (lamellate). Verlag Mykologia: Luzern, Switzerland. p. 361.
"Systematics of Lyophyllum Section Difformia Based on Evidence from Culture Studies and Ribosomal DNA Sequences". Mycologia 85(5): 788–794.

External links

Lyophyllaceae
Edible fungi
Fungi described in 1818
Fungi of Europe
Fungi of North America